Bornem Castle, also known as the Marnix de Sainte-Aldegonde Castle (or Kasteel Marnix de Sainte-Aldegonde), is a country house, formerly a castle, located in Bornem, province of Antwerp, Belgium. Bornem Castle is situated at an elevation of 1 meters.

History 
The building stands on the Oude Schelde, a tributary of the Scheldt. The earliest fortification on the site was of the 10th or 11th centuries and was intended to defend against the incursions of the Vikings. A manor house was built on the foundations of the older building in 1587 by the Spanish nobleman Pedro Coloma, Baron of Bornhem and lord of Bobadilla, a follower of Alexander Farnese. The property was afterwards leased by the family de Marnix de Sainte-Aldegonde, who became the outright owners in 1773.

The present house was built on the same site at the end of the 19th century to plans by Hendrik Beyaert, after the remains of the 16th century building had been demolished. It remains in ownership of the house Marnix de Sainte-Aldegonde, the current resident is John de Marnix de Sainte-Aldegonde, 14th Count of Bornem.

List of Chatelains

House of Coloma
 Pedro Coloma, Baron of Bornhem
 Pierre Coloma, Viscount of Dourlens
 Jean-François Coloma, 1st Count of Bornhem
 François-Claude Coloma, 2nd Count of Bornhem
 Charles-Joseph-François Coloma, 3rd Count of Bornhem, died 1724
 Marie-Florence Coloma, 4th Countess of Bornhem
 Aldegonde-Eleonore de Lannoy; Lady of Bornem: marr. Baudry-Adelbert de Marnix.

House of Marnix

See also
List of castles in Belgium

Sources

External links

Bouwkundig Erfgoed Vlaanderen 

Castles in Belgium
Castles in Antwerp Province
Castle